"Cassandra" is a song by Australian band Sherbet, released in September 1973 as the first and only single from Sherbet's second studio album, On with the Show. The song was written by Sherbet members Garth Porter and Clive Shakespeare. Cassandra peaked at number 5 on Go-Set and it also peaked at number 9 on the Kent Music Report.

Track listing

Personnel
Bass, vocals – Tony Mitchell
Drums – Alan Sandow
Electric guitar, acoustic guitar, slide guitar, vocals – Clive Shakespeare
Lead vocals – Daryl Braithwaite
Organ, piano, mellotron, harpsichord, vocals – Garth Porter
Production 
 Howard Gable - (tracks 2)

Charts

References

Sherbet (band) songs
1973 singles
1973 songs
Festival Records singles
Infinity Records singles
Songs written by Garth Porter
Songs written by Clive Shakespeare